Group B of the WABA League took place between 5 October 2016 and it will end on 29 December 2016.

The four best ranked teams advanced to the League 8.

Standings

Fixtures and results
All times given below are in Central European Time (for the match played in Bulgaria is time expressed in Eastern European Time).

Game 1

Game 2

Game 3

Game 4

Game 5

Game 6

Game 7

Game 8

Game 9

Game 10

References

External links
Official website

Group B
2016–17 in Serbian basketball
2016–17 in Montenegrin basketball
2016–17 in Bulgarian basketball
2016–17 in Slovenian basketball
2016–17 in Republic of Macedonia basketball